The Communauté d'agglomération du Beauvaisis is a communauté d'agglomération located in the Oise department and in the Hauts-de-France region of France. Its seat is in the town Beauvais. It was created on 1 January 2017 by merger of the former Communauté d'agglomération du Beauvaisis with the Communauté de communes rurales du Beauvaisis, and was expanded with 9 communes from the Communauté de communes de l'Oise Picarde in January 2018. Its area is 539.0 km2. Its population was 102,607 in 2017, of which 56,254 in Beauvais proper.

Composition
The communauté d'agglomération consists of the following 53 communes:

Allonne
Auchy-la-Montagne
Auneuil
Auteuil
Aux Marais
Bailleul-sur-Thérain
Beauvais
Berneuil-en-Bray
Bonlier
Bresles
Crèvecœur-le-Grand
Le Fay-Saint-Quentin
Fontaine-Saint-Lucien
Fouquenies
Fouquerolles
Francastel
Frocourt
Goincourt
Guignecourt
Haudivillers
Herchies
Hermes
Juvignies
Lachaussée-du-Bois-d'Écu
Lafraye
Laversines
Litz
Luchy
Maisoncelle-Saint-Pierre
Maulers
Milly-sur-Thérain
Le Mont-Saint-Adrien
Muidorge
La Neuville-en-Hez
Nivillers
Pierrefitte-en-Beauvaisis
Rainvillers
Rémérangles
Rochy-Condé
Rotangy
La Rue-Saint-Pierre
Saint-Germain-la-Poterie
Saint-Léger-en-Bray
Saint-Martin-le-Nœud
Saint-Paul
Le Saulchoy
Savignies
Therdonne
Tillé
Troissereux
Velennes
Verderel-lès-Sauqueuse
Warluis

Demography

Transport

The CAB is the organizing authority for mobility (AOTU). As such, it is the owner of the bus network known as Corolis since 2010, which serves Beauvais and the agglomeration. The agglomeration is a member of the Beauvais-Tillé Airport Mixed Union, founded on October 20, 2006, alongside the region and the department of Oise. This union owns Beauvais–Tillé Airport.

See also
 Communes of the Oise department

References

External links
 

Beauvaisis
Beauvaisis